Yekaterina Mikhailovna Popova (Russian: Екатерина Михайловна Попова; 6 December 1941 – 29 July 1994), was a Russian-born politician who was a member of the State Duma from 1993 until her death in 1994.

Biography

Before being elected to the State Duma, she was the chief physician of the Republican Hospital of Syktyvkar. From 1990 to 1994, she was a People's Deputy of the Komi Republic.

In the State Duma, Popova was a member of the Committee on Nationalities and a member of the Credentials Commission. She was a member of the Women of Russia faction.

She died on 29 July 1994.

References

1941 births
1994 deaths
People from Syktyvkar
First convocation members of the State Duma (Russian Federation)
20th-century Russian women politicians